Gynoeryx is a genus of moths in the family Sphingidae first described by Robert Herbert Carcasson in 1968.

Species
Gynoeryx bilineatus (Griveaud 1959)
Gynoeryx brevis (Oberthur 1909)
Gynoeryx integer (Viette 1956)
Gynoeryx meander (Boisduval 1875)
Gynoeryx paulianii (Viette 1956)
Gynoeryx teteforti (Griveaud 1964)

References

 
Smerinthini
Moth genera
Taxa named by Robert Herbert Carcasson